The Wright Model D was built to sell to the United States Army for an observation aircraft. It was similar in design to the Wright Model R with a 6-60 motor. The Model D could fly 66.9 mph and climb 525 feet per minute, but its excessive landing speed discouraged the Army from ordering more.

Development
The aircraft was built to fulfill a request by the United States Army for a speed scout.

Design
The single seat aircraft was made from ash and spruce wood coated with aluminum powder. It used forward mounted finlets ("blinkers" in Wright terminology) to stabilize the aircraft. It was powered by the last six cylinder engine built by the Wright Brothers with a rubber band drive on the flywheel. The 406 cubic inch engine ran at 1,400 to 1560rpm powering two counterrotating propellers via chains.

Operational history
Orville Wright considered the Model D “the easiest to control of any we have ever built” with the exception of the high landing speed.
The United States Army acquired two aircraft in August 1912. One of the two was wrecked and rebuilt during trials. On May 3, 1913 the "speed scout" S.C. no 19 was accepted, and on June 6, 1913 the second aircraft was accepted. Both were not flown regularly and were retired in 1914.

The 1913 engine is on display at the Smithsonian National Air and Space Museum.

Specifications (Wright Model D)

References

Notes

Single-engined twin-prop pusher aircraft
1910s United States military reconnaissance aircraft
Model D
Aircraft first flown in 1912